Angola is divided into eighteen provinces, known in Portuguese as províncias:
{| style="width:100%; background:transparent;"
|- valign="top"
|

See also
List of provinces of Angola by Human Development Index
Municipalities of Angola
 Communes of Angola
 ISO 3166-2:AO, the ISO codes for Angola.

References

Bibliography
 

 
Subdivisions of Angola
Angola, Provinces
Angola 1
Provinces, Angola
Angola geography-related lists